Pat Marsh (born January 6, 1949 in Fayetteville, Tennessee) is an American politician and a Republican member of the Tennessee House of Representatives representing District 62 since winning the special election on October 13, 2009 to fill the vacancy caused by the resignation of Representative Curt Cobb.

Education
Marsh earned his BS in business and transportation from the University of Tennessee.

Elections
2012 Marsh was unopposed for both the August 2, 2012 Republican Primary, winning with 3,008 votes, and the November 6, 2012 General election, winning with 15,423 votes.
2009 In the District 62 special election to succeed Democratic Representative Curt Cobb, March ran in the four-way August 27, 2009 Republican Primary, winning with 1,826 votes (69.7%), and won the three-way October 13, 2009 General election with 4,931 votes (55.7%) against Democratic nominee Ty Cobb and Independent candidate Christopher Brown.
2010 Marsh was challenged in the August 5, 2010 Republican Primary, winning with 6,087 votes (87.3%), and won the November 2, 2010 General election with 11,931 votes (74.8%) against Democratic nominee Jenny Hunt.

References

External links
Official page at the Tennessee General Assembly
Campaign site

Pat Marsh at Ballotpedia
Pat Marsh at OpenSecrets

1949 births
21st-century American politicians
Living people
Republican Party members of the Tennessee House of Representatives
People from Fayetteville, Tennessee
People from Shelbyville, Tennessee
University of Tennessee alumni